Kabhie Tum Kabhie Hum is a 2002 Indian Hindi movie. The movie stars Mamta Kulkarni (in her final Hindi film role), Charuhas Shidore,  Anjan Srivastav and Vijayendra Ghatge. The movie was directed by Roop Dutta Naik.

Plot

Dinanath Shastri (Anjan Srivastav) is a retired bank manager. As he has never taken his family for a vacation, he decides to take them to Panchwati. He books the bank's guest house. During his last days at the bank he had turned down the loan application of Mr. Shrivastav (Vijayendra Ghatge), which did not go too well with the latter. On reaching the guest house, Dinanath Shastri finds out that the guest house is already let out to Mr. Shrivastav and his family. Apparently the caretaker was bribed by Mr. Shrivastav. Dinanath is enraged by this and decides to stay put and trouble Mr. Shrivastav.

Meanwhile, Mr. Shrivastav realises that Dinanath is same the manager who rejected his loan application.

The movie revolves around the conflicts between the families in a comical way with romance in the backdrop.

Cast 

 Mamta Kulkarni  as Sumona
 Anjan Srivastav as Dinanath Shastri
 Vijayendra Ghadge as Mr. Shrivastav
 Charuhas Shidore as Unknown

References

2002 films
2000s Hindi-language films